Nicolay Peter Dreyer (21 March 1773 – 29 April 1808) was a Norwegian military officer with the rank of captain. He was born in Fosnes. He became a legend during the Battle of Trangen on 25 April 1808, leading his infantry regiment first from a roof, then from a tree stump with the height of a man. The stump was later named after him, a series of myths developed after his death, and he became a national symbol in 1814 and in 1905.

References

1773 births
1808 deaths
People from Nord-Trøndelag
Norwegian military personnel killed in the Napoleonic Wars